Ramanthali  is a village in Kannur district in the Indian state of Kerala. It boasts the gateway for Indian Naval Academy in Ezhiamala.

Demographics
 India census, Ramanthali had a population of 21937 with 10173 males and 11764 females. Anjaneyagiri, famous Hanuman statue is situated here.

Ettikkulam
The southern side of Ramanthali village is called Ettikkulam.  There is a lighthouse here. This village is Muslim dominated.

Transportation
The national highway passes through Perumba junction. Goa and Mumbai can be accessed on the northern side and Cochin and Thiruvananthapuram can be accessed on the southern side.  The road to the east of Iritty connects to Mysore and Bangalore.   The nearest railway station is Payyanur on Mangalore-Palakkad line. 
Trains are available to almost all parts of India subject to advance booking over the internet.  There are airports at Kannur, Mangalore and Calicut. All of them are international airports but direct flights are available only to Middle Eastern countries.

Notable people
Sudhakaran Ramanthali, writer and translator.

See also
Payyannur
Valiyaparamba Backwaters 15 km from Payyanur
Peringome 20 km from Payyanur
Ezhimala 12 km from Payyanur Town
Kunhimangalam village 8 km from Payyanur town
Kavvayi Island 3 km from Payyanur
Karivellur 10 km from Payyanur
Trikarpur 6 km from Payyanur
Ramanthali inscriptions

References

Villages near Payyanur
Villages in Kannur district